Van Cleve is an unincorporated community in Maries County, in the U.S. state of Missouri. The original Van Cleve was located on Road 222 and was platted as a town-later the post office and town’s name moved 1/4 mile past Carnes Branch off of hwy 133

History
A post office called Vancleve was established in 1880, and remained in operation until 1930. The community was named after a local politician.

References

Unincorporated communities in Maries County, Missouri
Unincorporated communities in Missouri